Jean Guillaume (Fosses-la-Ville, 28 October 1918 – Namur, 9 February 2001) was a Belgian writer in Wallon. He investigated this language and he published in French Œuvres Poétiques Wallonnes (Wallon Poetic Works).  Among his associates were Hubert Haas and Georges Smal.

Works
Djusqu' au solia (1947)
Gregnes d' awousse (1949)
Aurzîye (1951)
Œuvres Poétiques Wallonnes (1989)
Padrî l's-uréyes (posthume) (2001)

External links
 Ene pådje sol pere Guillaume

Belgian writers in Walloon
1918 births
2001 deaths